Aphyosemion australe, the lyretail panchax, golden panchax or Cape Lopez lyretail,  is a species of freshwater fish belonging to the family Aplocheilidae. It is found around Cape Lopez and in surrounding areas in Gabon.

Appearance

A. australe comes in a two colours. The wild type are brown and called 'chocolate' in the aquarium hobby and a man made 'gold' form exists which is orange; this form was spontaneous mutation bred by a Finnish aquarist name Hjerssen in 1952. JJ Scheel in "Rivulins of the World World (TFH PRess, 1970) deleted the pointed out these were not a separate specues and deprecated the name Aphyosemion australe hjersseni. Males can reach a length of around 6 cm, with females being slightly smaller. The caudal fin is lyre-shaped, which is characteristic of the genus. The females also are less colourful; their body colouration is brownish tan for the wild form and a light tan for the gold/orange form, and they have rounder fins.

In the aquarium

The Cape Lopez lyretail is one of the most popular and commonly available species of killifish. Spawns readily in the aquarium in nearly any water, spawning in fine-leafed water plants, such as aquatic moss. They adapt well to any variety of commercially prepared foods, flake or frozen livefoods but like all killifish do better with living foods cultured or caught from clean sources.

References

External links
 Fishbase

australe
Fish described in 1921